Kalam is a Kalam language of Papua New Guinea. It is closely related to Kobon, and shares many of the features of that language. Kalam is spoken in Middle Ramu District of Madang Province and in Mount Hagen District of Western Highlands Province.

Thanks to decades of studies by anthropologists such as Ralph Bulmer and others, Kalam is one of the best-studied Trans-New Guinea languages to date.

Dialects
There are two distinct dialects of Kalam that are highly distinguishable from each other.
, with 20,000 speakers, is centered in the Upper Kaironk and Upper Simbai Valleys.
, with 5,000 speakers is centered in the Asai Valley. It includes the Tai variety.

Kobon is closely related.

Kalam has an elaborate pandanus avoidance register used during karuka harvest that has been extensively documented.

Phonology

Consonants

Vowels

Evolution

Below are some Kalam reflexes of proto-Trans-New Guinea proposed by Pawley (2012, 2018). Data is from the  dialect unless otherwise noted.

Verbs
Kalam has eight tense-aspect categories. There are four past tenses, two present tenses, and two future tenses, which are all marked using suffixes:
past habitual
remote past (yesterday or earlier)
today's past
immediate past
present habitual
present progressive
immediate future
future

Intransitive verbs in Kalam can be classified as either active or stative. Some active intransitive verbs are:
- ‘go’
- ‘sleep’
- ‘stand, dance’
- ‘die, cease to function’

Some stative verbs are:
- ‘(of things) break, be broken’
- ‘(of a fire) go out’
- ‘burn, be burnt, fully cooked’
- ‘(of solid objects and surfaces) crack, burst, shatter’

Serial verb constructions
Transitivity is derived using resultative or cause-effect serial verb constructions.

(1)
{|
|pak || sug-
|-
|strike || extinguished
|}
‘put out a fire’

(2)
{|
|pak || wk-
|-
|strike || shattered
|}
‘knock something to bits, shatter something’

(3)
{|
|pug || sug-
|-
|blow || extinguished
|}
‘blow out a flame’

(4)
{|
|puŋi || ask-
|-
|pierce || opened
|}
‘prise something open’

(5)
{|
|puŋi || lak-
|-
|pierce || split
|}
‘split something by wedging or levering’

(6)
{|
|taw || pag || yok-
|-
|step.on || broken || displaced
|}
‘break something off by stepping on it’

(7)
{|
|tb || kluk || yok-
|-
|cut || gouge || displaced
|}
‘gouge something out’

Other serial verb constructions in Kalam include:
d ap (get come) ‘bring’
d am (get go) ‘take’
am d ap (go get come) ‘fetch’
d nŋ (touch perceive) ‘feel’
ñb nŋ (eat perceive) ‘taste’
tb tk (cut sever) ‘cut off’

Nouns

Compounds
Some examples of nominal compounds in Kalam:

(1)
bin-b
woman-man
‘person, people’
(2)
ña-pañ
son-daughter
‘child, children’
(3)
aps-basd
grandmother-grandfather
‘grandparents’
(4)
ami-gon bapi-gon
mother-children father-children
‘nuclear family, parents and children’
(5)
kmn-as
game.mammal-small.wild.mammal
‘wild mammals’
(6)
kaj-kayn-kobti
pig-dog-cassowary
‘large animals’
(7)
kmn-kaj-kobti
game.mammal-pig-cassowary
‘animals that provide ceremonially valued meat’
(8)
mñ-mon
vine-tree
‘land, country, territory, world’
(9)
{|
|kneb || ameb || owep || wog || wati || gep
|-
|sleeping || going || coming || garden || fence || making
|}
‘everyday activities’

Animal names
Fauna classification (folk taxonomy) in the Kalam language has been extensively studied by Ralph Bulmer and others. Kalam speakers classify wild mammals into three major categories:
 ‘game mammals, larger wild mammals’: tree kangaroos, wallabies, cuscuses, ringtail possums, giant rats, and bandicoots
 ‘small wild mammals’: most bush-rats, sugar gliders, and pygmy possums (including Pogonomys spp., Melomys spp., and Phascolosorex dorsalis)
 ‘dirty rats’ (Rattus spp.)

Other animal categories are:
 ‘flying birds and bats’
 ‘cassowaries’
 ‘pigs’ (formerly including cattle, horses, and goats when first encountered by the Kalam)
 ‘dogs’
 ‘certain snakes’
 ‘skinks’

Rodent names include:
House Rat (Rattus exulans, Rattus niobe, Rattus ruber) –  ~ 
Garden Rat (Rattus ruber) – 
Long-snouted Rat (Rattus verecundus) – 
Small Mountain Rat (Rattus niobe) – 
Giant Cane Rat (Hyomys goliath) – 
Grassland Melomys Rat (Melomys rufescens) – 
Lorentz's Rat (Melomys lorentzii, Melomys platyops) – ;  (M. lorentzii spreads Pandanus julianettii seeds, according to the Kalam)
rat that feeds on pandanus nuts (Anisomys imitator) –   ~ 
Highland Giant Tree Rat (Uromys anak) – 
Lowland Giant Tree Rat (Uromys caudimaculatus) – 
Mountain Water-rat (Hydromys shawmayeri) – 
Waterside Rat (Parahydromys asper) – , 
Earless Water Rat (Crossomys moncktoni) – 
small rat, found near homesteads – 

Marsupial names include:
Pseudochirops corinnae (Golden or Stationary Ringtail) – 
Pseudochirops cupreus (Copper Ringtail) – 
Pseudochirulus forbesi – (Painted Ringtail) – 
Cercartetus caudatus (Pygmy Possum) – 
Dactylopsila palpator (Mountain striped possum, Long-fingered Triok) – 
Echymipera sp. – ? 
Phalanger carmelitae (Black Mountain Cuscus) – 
Phalanger gymnotis (Ground Cuscus) – 
Phalanger maculatus – 
Phalanger orientalis – ? 
Phalanger permixteo – ? 
Phalanger sericeus (Silky Cuscus, Beech Cuscus) – 
Phalanger sp. – 
Spilocuscus maculatus – 
Microperoryctes longicauda (Long-tailed Bandicoot) – 
Peroryctes raffrayana (Hunting Bandicoot) – 
Phascolosorex dorsalis – ; may also refer to Antechinus melanurus (Marsupial Rat)
Dasyurus albopunctatus (New Guinea Quoll, Marsupial Cat) – 
Dendrolagus goodfellowi (Tree Kangaroo) - 
Petaurus breviceps (Sugar Glider) – 
Thylogale brunii (Bush Wallaby) – 
Dorcopsulus vanheurni (Small Forest Wallaby, Common Mountain Forest Wallaby) - 

Reptile names and folk taxonomy in Kalam:
yñ: reptiles
yñ yb: familiar small lizards
yñ ladk: gecko
yñ yb: skink
yñ yb: colonial skinks
kls: Papuascincus stanleyanus, Common skink
mabdagol: Papuascincus stanleyanus, Red-tailed skink
mas: Emoia spp., Ant skinks (including E. baudini [most common], E. pallidiceps, and perhaps also E. kordoana)
yñ ladk: non-colonial skinks
sydn: Prasinohaema prehensicauda, Casuarina skink
sydn km: Green casuarina skink
sydn mlep: Brown casuarina skink
mañmod: Prasinohaema flavipes, Tree skink
pymakol: Lobulia elegans, Beech skink
mamŋ: Sphenomorphus darlingtoni, Begonia skink
komñ: Sphenomorphus sp.nr. jobiensis, Bush skink
ñgñolom: Sphenomorphus leptofasciatus, Banded skink
wowy: Lepidodactylus sp., Common gecko
yñ ladk: reptiles other than familiar small lizards
aypot: Hypsilurus nigrigularis, Dragon lizard
wbl: Varanus spp.
wbl km: Varanus prasinus, Emerald monitor
wbl yb: Varanus indicus, Water monitor
ñom: snakes
soyŋ; ñom: relatively harmless snakes
klŋan: Chondropython viridis, Green python
soyŋ: ordinary snakes, Tropidonophis montanus, Toxicocalamus loriae, etc.
soyŋ yb
soyŋ pok: reddish snake
soyŋ mosb: dark green snake
sataw: terrifying serpents
ymgwp: Python spp.
nm: Python amethistinus, Giant python
jjoj: snake sp.
kodkl: Acanthophis laevis, Death adder (?)
sataw: Micropechis ikaheca, Small-eyed snake (?)
other terrifying reptiles

Frog names in Kalam are:
Litoria angiana (various phenotypes): komnaŋat, jejeg, (jejeg) pkay, kawag
komnaŋat: bright green polymorph; usually found in Saurauia spp. and Ficus dammaropsis
kawag: dark green or black polymorph
jejeg: four types:
jejeg pkay: polymorph with reddish belly
jejeg mj-kmab or jejeg km: bright green polymorph
jejeg mlep: dull brown polymorph
jejeg mosb: black polymorph
Litoria arfakiana: daŋboŋ
Litoria modica (or Litoria becki): wyt
Litoria micromembrana: kosoj
Litoria bulmeri: kogop
Nyctimystes disruptus: kwyos, gepgep
kiwos: red-bellied polymorphs
Nyctimystes foricula: gojmay (also bin-pk)
Nyctimystes kubori: kwelek
Nyctimystes narinosus: mabas
Nyctimystes  sp.: kabanm
Oxydactyla brevicrus: kabanm
Cophixalus parkeri: kabanm [mature], lk (including bopnm) [immature]
Cophixalus riparius: gwnm
Cophixalus shellyi: gwnm sbmganpygak
Choerophryne variegata: lk (including bopnm)
Asterophrys sp.: gwnm
Xenorhina rostrata: gwnm
Barygenys sp.: gwnm sbmganpygak
Papurana grisea: akpt, cebs

Note: Cophixalus shellyi, Choerophryne darlingtoni, and Oxydactyla brevicrus also tend to be identified by Kalam speakers as lk if calling from low vegetation, but as gwnm (usually applied to Cophixalus riparius and Xenorhina rostrata) if found in daytime hiding spots.

Plant categories include:
mon ‘trees and shrubs’ (excluding palms and pandans); e.g., bljan ‘Macaranga spp.’ is a mon that has four named kinds
mñ ‘vines and robust creepers’

A comprehensive list of Kalam plant and animal names is given below.

Semantics

Colors
Kalam speakers distinguish more than a dozen color categories.
 ‘white, light coloured’
 ‘grey, esp. of hair’
 ‘light grey; ash’
 ‘black, dark coloured’
 ‘red/purple; blood’
 ‘orange/bright reddish-brown/bright yellowish-brown/rich yellow; ripe’
 ‘rather bright red-brown/yellow brown’
 ‘yellow’
 ‘green’
 ‘pale green, yellow-green; unripe (of fruit)’
 ‘rich green, sheeny; succulent or mature (of foliage)’
 ‘dull brown, green or olive’
 ‘straw coloured; withered (of foliage)’
 ‘blue’
 ‘blue-grey, as blue-grey clay’
 ‘striped, spotted, mottled’

Time
Pawley and Bulmer (2011), quoted in Pawley and Hammarström (2018), lists the following temporal adverbs in Kalam.
 ‘today’
 ‘tomorrow’
 ‘day after tomorrow’
 ‘yesterday’
 ‘day before yesterday’
 ‘3 days from today’
 ‘3 days ago’
 ‘4 days from today’
 ‘4 days ago’
 ‘5 days from today’
 ‘5 days ago’

Morphology

Rhyming compounds
Kalam, like English, has different types of rhyming compounds.
alternating consonants
gadal-badal [ŋgándálmbándál] ‘placed in a disorderly manner, criss-cross, higgledy-piggledy’
gley-wley [ŋgɨléywuléy] ‘rattling, clattering’

addition of consonants
adk-madk [ándɨkmándɨk] ‘turned over, reversed’
ask-mask [ásɨkmásɨk] ‘ritually restricted’

alternating vowels
ñugl-ñagl [ɲúŋgɨlɲáŋgɨl] ‘sound of evening chorus of insects and frogs’
gtiŋ-gtoŋ [ŋgɨríŋgɨróŋ] ‘loud noise, din, racket’

See also
Ralph Bulmer
Ian Saem Majnep

References

Andrew Pawley and Ralph Bulmer. 2011. A dictionary of Kalam with ethnographic notes. Canberra: Pacific Linguistics.

Further reading
Bulmer, Ralph N.H. 1967. Why is the cassowary not a bird? A problem of zoological taxonomy among the Karam of the New Guinea highlands. Man 2(1): 5–25.
Bulmer, Ralph N.H. 1968. Kalam colour categories. Kivung 1(3): 120–133.
Bulmer, Ralph N.H. 1974. Folk biology in the New Guinea highlands. Social Science Information 13(4/5): 9–28.
Bulmer, Ralph N.H. and J.I. Menzies. 1972–1973. Kalam classification of marsupials and rodents. Journal of the Polynesian Society 81(4): 472–499, 82(1):86–107.
Bulmer, Ralph N.H. and Michael Tyler. 1968. Karam classification of frogs. Journal of the Polynesian Society 77(4): 621–639.
Bulmer, Ralph N.H., J.I. Menzies and F. Parker. 1975. Kalam classification of reptiles and fish. Journal of the Polynesian Society 84(3): 267–308.
Majnep, Ian Saem and Ralph Bulmer. 1977. Birds of my Kalam Country. Auckland: Auckland and Oxford University Presses.
Majnep, Ian Saem and Ralph Bulmer. 2007. Animals the Ancestors Hunted: An Account of the Wild Mammals of the Kalam Area, Papua New Guinea. Adelaide: Crawford House Australia.

Languages of Papua New Guinea
Kalam languages
Pandanus avoidance registers